The following is a list of the 23 cantons of the Meurthe-et-Moselle department, in France, following the French canton reorganisation which came into effect in March 2015:

 Baccarat
 Entre Seille et Meurthe
 Grand Couronné
 Jarny
 Jarville-la-Malgrange
 Laxou
 Longwy
 Lunéville-1
 Lunéville-2
 Meine au Saintois
 Mont-Saint-Martin
 Nancy-1
 Nancy-2
 Nancy-3
 Neuves-Maisons
 Le Nord-Toulois
 Pays de Briey
 Pont-à-Mousson
 Saint-Max
 Toul
 Val de Lorraine Sud
 Vandœuvre-lès-Nancy
 Villerupt

References